Germaine Pratt (born May 21, 1996) is an American football linebacker for the Cincinnati Bengals of the National Football League (NFL). He played college football at NC State, and was drafted by the Bengals in the third round of the 2019 NFL Draft.

Early years
Pratt attended High Point Central High School in High Point, North Carolina. He committed to North Carolina State University to play college football.

College career
Pratt played at NC State from 2014 to 2018. During his career, he had 235 tackles, six sacks, four interceptions and a touchdown.

Professional career

2019
The Cincinnati Bengals selected Pratt in the third round (72nd overall) of the 2019 NFL Draft. Pratt was the eighth linebacker drafted in 2019.

On June 27, 2019, the Cincinnati Bengals signed Pratt to a four-year, $4.08 million contract that includes a signing bonus of $1.05 million.

Throughout training camp, Pratt competed for a role as a starting linebacker against Preston Brown, Nick Vigil, Jordan Evans, Hardy Nickerson, Malik Jefferson, Deshaun Davis and Noah Dawkins. Head coach Zac Taylor named Pratt the primary backup linebacker, behind starters Preston Brown, Nick Vigil, and Jordan Evans, to begin the regular season.

He made his professional regular season debut during the Cincinnati Bengals’ season-opener at the Seattle Seahawks and assisted on one tackle in the 21–20 loss. On October 13, 2019, Pratt earned his first career start and recorded five combined tackles (four solo) during a 23 –17 loss at the Baltimore Ravens in Week 6. In Week 10, Pratt started at middle linebacker, replacing Preston Brown, and made four combined tackles (three solo) in the Bengals’ 49–13 loss against the Baltimore Ravens. On November 12, 2019, the Cincinnati Bengals waived Preston Brown. Defensive coordinator Lou Anarumo subsequently named Pratt the starting middle linebacker for the remainder of the season. On December 22, 2019, Pratt collected a season-high 11 combined tackles (nine solo) during a 38–35 loss at the Miami Dolphins in Week 16. He finished his rookie campaign in 2019 with a total of 76 combined tackles (50 solo) in 16 games and nine starts.

2020
Head coach Zac Taylor elected to install a base 5-2 defense and named Pratt and Josh Bynes as the starting linebackers with Carlos Dunlap and Sam Hubbard as edge rushers. He started in the Cincinnati Bengals’ season-opener against the Los Angeles Chargers and made 12 combined tackles (eight solo) during a 16–13 loss.

2021
Against the Las Vegas Raiders in the Wild Card round, Pratt recorded six tackles, and recorded the game ending interception on Derek Carr in the 26–19 win, securing the Bengals first playoff win since 1991.

2023
On March 14, 2023, Pratt signed a three-year, $20.25 million contract extension with the Bengals.

References

External links
NC State Wolfpack bio
Cincinnati Bengals bio

1996 births
Living people
Sportspeople from High Point, North Carolina
Players of American football from North Carolina
American football linebackers
NC State Wolfpack football players
Cincinnati Bengals players